PNX can stand for:

Phong-Kniang (language code)
Phoenix Companies (ticker symbol)
Phoenix LRT station, Singapore (LRT station abbreviation)
many of the other meanings of Phoenix (disambiguation)
A Unix-like operating system developed by ICL for the PERQ workstation computer